Oxya sinuosa is a species of short-horned grasshopper in the family Acrididae. It is found in eastern Asia.

References

External links

 

sinuosa
Insects described in 1951